Dalakia is a monotypic snout moth genus described by Hans Georg Amsel in 1961. Its only species, Dalakia uniformella, is found in Iran and the United Arab Emirates.

References

Phycitinae
Monotypic moth genera
Moths of Asia
Taxa named by Hans Georg Amsel
Pyralidae genera